William Warren Bush (born November 7, 1935) is an American actor, usually credited as Billy Green Bush and sometimes as Billy Greenbush.

Typecast
Bush is a character actor, typically projecting in his screen appearances the good-ol'-boy image. He portrays mostly sheriffs and state troopers, although in his repertoire there are the occasional villains.

Film
Bush's film work includes appearances in The Savage Seven (1968), Five Easy Pieces (1970), Monte Walsh (1970), The Jesus Trip (1971), The Organization (1971), Welcome Home, Soldier Boys (1972), The Culpepper Cattle Co. (1972), 40 Carats (1973), Electra Glide in Blue (1973) where his performance caused some critics to characterize his screen persona as "irrepressibly unique"; Alice Doesn't Live Here Anymore (1974), Mackintosh and T.J. (1975), The Call of the Wild (1976), The Beasts Are on the Streets (1978), The Jericho Mile (1979), Tom Horn (1980), The River (1984), The Hitcher (1986), Critters (1986), Rampage (1987) and Jason Goes to Hell: The Final Friday (1993).

Television
Bush has appeared frequently on television, including a recurring role as Bobby Angel on Hill Street Blues and an episode of M*A*S*H, in which his character, “Cowboy”, tries to kill commanding officer Henry Blake.

He twice portrayed Vernon Presley, the father of Elvis Presley, first in the 1988 TV movie Elvis and Me, which was based on the eponymous biography written by Presley's ex-wife Priscilla, and then in the short-lived weekly series Elvis in 1990.

Personal life
Bush is the father of twins Lindsay and Sidney Greenbush (retired child actresses who alternately starred as Carrie in Little House on the Prairie) and actor Clay Greenbush.

Selected filmography

 Unholy Matrimony (1966) - Eavesdropping Husband (uncredited)
 The Savage Seven (1968) - Seely
 The Reivers (1969) - Patron
 Five Easy Pieces (1970) - Elton
 Monte Walsh (1970) - Powder Kent
 The Jesus Trip (1971) - Tarboro
 The Organization (1971) - Dave Thomas
 Welcome Home, Soldier Boys (1972) - Sheriff
 The Culpepper Cattle Co. (1972) - Frank Culpepper
 Mister Brown (1972)
 40 Carats (1973) - J.D. Rogers
 Electra Glide in Blue (1973) - Zipper
 Gunsmoke (1973) - Kermit
 Alice Doesn't Live Here Anymore (1974) - Donald
 Mackintosh and T.J. (1975) - Luke
 The Call of the Wild (1976) - Redsweater
 The Beasts Are on the Streets (1978) - Jim Scudder
 The Incredible Hulk (1978-1982) - Ray Thomas / Sheriff Carl Decker
 The Jericho Mile (1979) - Warden Earl Gulliver
 Tom Horn (1980) - U.S. Marshal Joe Belle
 The River (1984) - Harve Stanley
 The Hitcher (1986) - Trooper Donner
 Critters (1986) - Jay Brown
 The Deliberate Stranger (TV - 1986) - Officer Bradley
 Rampage (1987) - Judge McKinsey
 Conagher (1991) - Jacob Teale
 Jason Goes to Hell: The Final Friday (1993) - Sheriff Ed Landis (final film role)

References

External links
 
 
 
 Billy Green Bush at Rotten Tomatoes
 Wm. Green Bush at the University of Wisconsin's Actors Studio audio collection

1935 births
Living people
American male film actors
American male television actors
Male actors from Montgomery, Alabama